Light rail transit (LRT) is a form of passenger urban rail transit characterized by a combination of tram and rapid transit features. While its rolling stock is more similar to a traditional tram, it operates at a higher capacity and speed, and often on an exclusive right-of-way. In many cities, light rail transit systems more closely resemble, and are therefore indistinguishable from, traditional underground or at-grade subways and heavy-rail metros. 

There is no standard definition, but in the United States (where the terminology was devised in the 1970s from the engineering term light railway), light rail operates primarily along exclusive rights-of-way and uses either individual tramcars or multiple units coupled to form a train that is lower capacity and lower speed than a long heavy-rail passenger train or rapid transit system.

A few light rail networks tend to have characteristics closer to rapid transit or even commuter rail; some of these heavier rapid transit-like systems are referred to as light metros. Other light rail networks are tram-like and partially operate on streets.

History

The world's first electric tram line operated in Sestroretsk near Saint Petersburg, Russia, invented and tested by Fyodor Pirotsky in 1880. The second line was the Gross-Lichterfelde tramway in Lichterfelde near Berlin in Germany, which opened in 1881. It was built by Werner von Siemens who contacted Pirotsky. This was the world's first commercially successful electric tram. It initially drew current from the rails, with overhead wire being installed in 1883. The first interurban to emerge in the United States was the Newark and Granville Street Railway in Ohio, which opened in 1889.

Postwar
Many original tram and streetcar systems in the United Kingdom, United States, and elsewhere were decommissioned starting in the 1950s as subsidies for the car increased. Britain abandoned its tram systems, except for Blackpool, with the closure of Glasgow Corporation Tramways (one of the largest in Europe) in 1962.

Revival
Although some traditional trolley or tram systems exist to this day in San Francisco cable car system and streetcars in New Orleans, the term "light rail" has come to mean a different type of rail system. Modern light rail technology has primarily West German origins since an attempt by Boeing Vertol to introduce a new American light rail vehicle was a technical failure. After World War II, the Germans retained many of their streetcar networks and evolved them into model light rail systems (Stadtbahnen). Except for Hamburg, all large and most medium-sized German cities maintain light rail networks.

The basic concepts of light rail were put forward by H. Dean Quinby in 1962 in an article in Traffic Quarterly called "Major Urban Corridor Facilities: A New Concept". Quinby distinguished this new concept in rail transportation from historic streetcar or tram systems as:
 having the capacity to carry more passengers
 appearing like a train, with more than one car connected
 having more doors to facilitate full utilization of the space
 faster and quieter in operation

The term light rail transit (LRT) was introduced in North America in 1972 to describe this new concept of rail transportation. Prior to that time the abbreviation "LRT" was used for "Light Rapid Transit" and "Light Rail Rapid Transit."

The first of the new light rail systems in North America began operation in 1978 when the Canadian city of Edmonton, Alberta, adopted the German Siemens-Duewag U2 system, followed three years later by CTrain Calgary, Alberta, and San Diego, California. The concept proved popular, and there are now at least 30 light rail systems in the United States and over 40 in North America.

Britain began replacing its run-down local railways with light rail in the 1980s, starting with the Tyne and Wear Metro and followed by the Docklands Light Railway (DLR) in London. The historic term light railway was used because it dated from the British Light Railways Act 1896, although the technology used in the DLR system was at the high end of what Americans considered to be light rail. The trend to light rail in the United Kingdom was firmly established with the success of the Manchester Metrolink system, which opened in 1992.

Definition

The term light rail was coined in 1972 by the U.S. Urban Mass Transportation Administration (UMTA; the precursor to the Federal Transit Administration) to describe new streetcar transformations that were taking place in Europe and the United States. In Germany, the term Stadtbahn (to be distinguished from S-Bahn, which stands for Stadtschnellbahn) was used to describe the concept, and many in UMTA wanted to adopt the direct translation, which is city rail (the Norwegian term, by bane, means the same). However, UMTA finally adopted the term light rail instead. Light in this context is used in the sense of "intended for light loads and fast movement", rather than referring to physical weight. The infrastructure investment is also usually lighter than would be found for a heavy rail system.

The Transportation Research Board (Transportation Systems Center) defined "light rail" in 1977 as "a mode of urban transportation utilizing predominantly reserved but not necessarily grade-separated rights-of-way. Electrically propelled rail vehicles operate singly or in trains. LRT provides a wide range of passenger capabilities and performance characteristics at moderate costs."

The American Public Transportation Association (APTA), in its Glossary of Transit Terminology, defines light rail as: 
...a mode of transit service (also called streetcar, tramway, or trolley) operating passenger rail cars singly (or in short, usually two-car or three-car, trains) on fixed rails in the right-of-way that is often separated from other traffic for part or much of the way. Light rail vehicles are typically driven electrically with power being drawn from an overhead electric line via a trolley [pole] or a pantograph; driven by an operator onboard the vehicle; and may have either high platform loading or low-level boarding using steps."  
However, some diesel-powered transit is designated light rail, such as the O-Train Trillium Line in Ottawa, Ontario, Canada, the River Line in New Jersey, United States, and the Sprinter in California, United States, which use diesel multiple unit (DMU) cars.

Light rail is similar to the British English term light railway, long-used to distinguish railway operations carried out under a less rigorous set of regulations using lighter equipment at lower speeds from mainline railways. Light rail is a generic international English phrase for these types of rail systems, which means more or less the same thing throughout the English-speaking world.

The use of the generic term light rail avoids some serious incompatibilities between British and American English. The word tram, for instance, is generally used in the UK and many former British colonies to refer to what is known in North America as a streetcar, but in North America tram can instead refer to an aerial tramway, or, in the case of the Disney amusement parks, even a land train. (The usual British term for an aerial tramway is cable car, which in the US usually refers to a ground-level car pulled along by subterranean cables.) The word trolley is often used as a synonym for streetcar in the United States but is usually taken to mean a cart, particularly a shopping cart, in the UK and elsewhere. Many North American transportation planners reserve streetcar for traditional vehicles that operate exclusively in mixed traffic on city streets, while they use light rail to refer to more modern vehicles operating mostly in exclusive rights of way, since they may operate both side-by-side targeted at different passenger groups.

The difference between British English and American English terminology arose in the late 19th century when Americans adopted the term "street railway", rather than "tramway", with the vehicles being called "streetcars" rather than "trams". Some have suggested that the Americans' preference for the term "street railway" at that time was influenced by German emigrants to the United States (who were more numerous than British immigrants in the industrialized Northeast), as it is the same as the German term for the mode, Straßenbahn (meaning "street railway"). A further difference arose because, while Britain abandoned all of its trams except Blackpool after World War II, eight major North American cities (Toronto, Boston, Philadelphia, San Francisco, Pittsburgh, Newark, Cleveland, and New Orleans) continued to operate large streetcar systems. When these cities upgraded to new technology, they called it light rail to differentiate it from their existing streetcars since some continued to operate both the old and new systems. Since the 1980s, Portland, Oregon, has built all three types of system: a high-capacity light rail system in dedicated lanes and rights-of-way, a low-capacity streetcar system integrated with street traffic, and an aerial tram system.

The opposite phrase heavy rail, used for higher-capacity, higher-speed systems, also avoids some incompatibilities in terminology between British and American English, for instance in comparing the London Underground and the New York City Subway. Conventional rail technologies including high-speed, freight, commuter, and rapid transit urban transit systems are considered "heavy rail". The main difference between light rail and heavy rail rapid transit is the ability for a light rail vehicle to operate in mixed traffic if the routing requires it.

People movers and personal rapid transit are even "lighter," at least in terms of capacity. Monorail is a separate technology that has been more successful in specialized services than in a commuter transit role.

Types

Due to varying definitions, it is hard to distinguish between what is called light rail, and other forms of urban and commuter rail. A system described as a light rail in one city may be considered to be a streetcar or tram system in another. Conversely, some lines that are called "light rail" are very similar to rapid transit; in recent years, new terms such as light metro have been used to describe these medium-capacity systems. Some "light rail" systems, such as Sprinter, bear little similarity to urban rail, and could alternatively be classified as commuter rail or even inter-city rail. In the United States, "light rail" has become a catch-all term to describe a wide variety of passenger rail systems.

There is a significant difference in cost between these different classes of light rail transit. Tram-like systems are often less expensive than metro-like systems by a factor of two or more.

Lower capacity
The most difficult distinction to draw is that between light rail and streetcar or tram systems. There is a significant amount of overlap between the technologies, many of the same vehicles can be used for either, and it is common to classify streetcars or trams as a subcategory of light rail rather than as a distinct type of transportation. The two general versions are:
 The traditional type, where tracks and trains run along the streets and share space with road traffic. Stops tend to be very frequent, but little effort is made to set up special stations. Because space is shared, the tracks are usually visually unobtrusive.
 A more modern variation, where the trains tend to run along with their own right-of-way, separated from road traffic. Stops are generally less frequent, and the vehicles are often boarded from a platform. Tracks are highly visible, and in some cases, significant effort is expended to keep traffic away through the use of special signaling, level crossings with gate arms, or even a complete separation (semi-metro) with non-level crossings.

Higher capacity

At the highest degree of separation, it can be difficult to draw the line between light rail and metros. The London Docklands Light Railway would likely not be considered as "light rail" were it not for the contrast between it and the rapid transit London Underground. In Europe and Asia, the term light rail is increasingly used to describe any rapid transit system with a fairly low frequency or short trains compared to heavier mass rapid systems such as the London Underground or Singapore's Mass Rapid Transit. However, upon closer inspection, these systems are better classified as light metro or people movers. For instance, Line 1 and Line 3 in Manila are often referred to as "light rail", despite being fully segregated, mostly elevated railways. This phenomenon is quite common in East Asian cities, where elevated metro lines in Shanghai, Wuhan, and Dalian in China; and Jakarta, Greater Jakarta and Palembang in Indonesia are called light rail lines. In North America, such systems are not usually considered light rail.

Mixed systems

Many systems have mixed characteristics. Indeed, with proper engineering, a rail line could run along a street, then go underground, and then run along an elevated viaduct. For example, the Los Angeles Metro Rail's L Line "light rail" has sections that could alternatively be described as a tramway, a light metro, and, in a narrow sense, rapid transit. This is especially common in the United States, where there is not a popularly perceived distinction between these different types of urban rail systems. The development of technology for low-floor and catenary-free trams facilitates the construction of such mixed systems with only short and shallow underground sections below critical intersections as the required clearance height can be reduced significantly compared to conventional light rail vehicles.

It is even possible to have high-floor rapid transit cars run along a street, like a tram; this is known as street running.

Speed and stop frequency

In some areas, "light rail" may also refer to any rail line with frequent low speeds or many stops in a short distance. This inherits the old definition of light railway in the UK. Hong Kong's Light Rail is an example of this, although it is also called "light rail" because it is a lower-scale system than the rest of the MTR. Sprinter in the San Diego area uses DMUs and is targeted towards a commuter rail audience; however, because of the large number of stops along the line, it is called the light rail.

Reference speed from major light rail systems, including station stop time, is shown below.	
	

However, low top speed is not always a differentiating characteristic between light rail and other systems. Los Angeles Metro light rail vehicles have higher top and average speeds than Montreal Metro or New York City Subway trains. The main difference is that Montreal Metro and New York City Subway trains carry far more passengers than any North American LRT system, and the trains have faster acceleration, making station-to-station times relatively short in their densely populated urban areas. Most light rail systems serve less densely populated cities and suburbs where passenger traffic is not high, but low cost combined with high top speed may be important to compete with automobiles.

System-wide considerations
Many light rail systems—even fairly old ones—have a combination of both on- and off-road sections. In some countries (especially in Europe), only the latter is described as light rail. In those places, trams running on mixed rights-of-way are not regarded as a light rail but considered distinctly as streetcars or trams. However, the requirement for saying that a rail line is "separated" can be quite low—sometimes just with concrete "buttons" to discourage automobile drivers from getting onto the tracks. Some systems such as Seattle's Link are truly mixed but closed to traffic, with light rail vehicles and traditional buses both operating along a common right-of-way.

Some systems, such as the AirTrain JFK in New York City, the DLR in London, and Kelana Jaya Line in Kuala Lumpur, have dispensed with the need for an operator. The Vancouver SkyTrain was an early adopter of driverless vehicles, while the Toronto Scarborough rapid transit operates the same trains as Vancouver, but uses drivers. In most discussions and comparisons, these specialized systems are generally not considered light rail but as light metro systems.

Track gauge
Historically, the track gauge has had considerable variations, with narrow gauge common in many early systems. However, most light rail systems are now standard gauge. Older standard-gauge vehicles could not negotiate sharp turns as easily as narrow-gauge ones, but modern light rail systems achieve tighter turning radii by using articulated cars. An important advantage of the standard gauge is that standard railway maintenance equipment can be used on it, rather than custom-built machinery. Using standard gauges also allows light rail vehicles to be conveniently moved around using the same tracks as freight railways. Additionally, wider gauges provide more floor clearance on low-floor trams that have constricted pedestrian areas at the wheels, which is especially important for wheelchair access, as narrower gauges can make it challenging or impossible to pass the tram's wheels. Furthermore, standard-gauge rolling stock can be switched between networks either temporarily or permanently, and both newly built and used standard-gauge rolling stock tends to be cheaper to buy, as more companies offer such vehicles.

Capacity

Efficiency

Energy efficiency for light rail may be 120 passenger miles per gallon of fuel (or equivalent), but variation is great, depending on circumstances.

Comparison with high capacity roads
One line of light rail (requires 7.6 m, 25' right of way) has a theoretical capacity of up to 8 times more than one 3.7 m (12 foot) lane on a freeway, excluding busses, during peak times. Roads have ultimate capacity limits that can be determined by traffic engineering, and usually experience a chaotic breakdown inflow and a dramatic drop in speed (a traffic jam) if they exceed about 2,000 vehicles per hour per lane (each car roughly two seconds behind another). Since most people who drive to work or on business trips do so alone, studies show that the average car occupancy on many roads carrying commuters is only about 1.5 people per car during the high-demand rush hour periods of the day.
This combination of factors limits roads carrying only automobile commuters to a maximum observed capacity of about 3,000 passengers per hour per lane. The problem can be mitigated by introducing high-occupancy vehicle (HOV) lanes and ride-sharing programs, but in most cases, policymakers have chosen to add more lanes to the roads, despite a small risk that in unfavorable situations an extension of the road network might lead to increased travel times (Downs–Thomson paradox, Braess paradox).

By contrast, light rail vehicles can travel in multi-car trains carrying a theoretical ridership up to 20,000 passengers per hour in much narrower rights-of-way, not much more than two car lanes wide for a double track system. They can often be run through existing city streets and parks, or placed in the medians of roads. If run in streets, trains are usually limited by city block lengths to about four 180-passenger vehicles (720 passengers). Operating on two-minute headways using traffic signal progression, a well-designed two-track system can handle up to 30 trains per hour per track, achieving peak rates of over 20,000 passengers per hour in each direction. More advanced systems with separate rights-of-way using moving block signaling can exceed 25,000 passengers per hour per track.

Practical considerations
Most light rail systems in the United States are limited by demand rather than capacity (by and large, most American LRT systems carry fewer than 4,000 persons per hour per direction), but Boston's and San Francisco's light rail lines carry 9,600 and 13,100 passengers per hour per track during rush hour. Elsewhere in North America, the Calgary C-Train and Monterrey Metro have higher light rail ridership than Boston or San Francisco. Systems outside North America often have much higher passenger volumes. The Manila Light Rail Transit System is one of the highest capacity ones, having been upgraded in a series of expansions to handle 40,000 passengers per hour per direction, and having carried as many as 582,989 passengers in a single day on its Line 1. It achieves this volume by running four-car trains with a capacity of up to 1,350 passengers each at a frequency of up to 30 trains per hour. However, the Manila light rail system has full grade separation and as a result, has many of the operating characteristics of a metro system rather than a light rail system. A capacity of 1,350 passengers per train is more similar to the heavy rail than light rail.

Bus rapid transit (BRT) is an alternative to LRT and many planning studies undertake a comparison of each mode when considering appropriate investments in transit corridor development. BRT systems can exhibit a more diverse range of design characteristics than LRT, depending on the demand and constraints that exist, and BRT using dedicated lanes can have a theoretical capacity of over 30,000 passengers per hour per direction (for example, the Guangzhou Bus Rapid Transit system operates up to 350 buses per hour per direction). For the effective operation of a bus or BRT system, buses must have priority at traffic lights and have their dedicated lanes, especially as bus frequencies exceed 30 buses per hour per direction. The higher theoretical of BRT relates to the ability of buses to travel closer to each other than rail vehicles and their ability to overtake each other at designated locations allowing express services to bypass those that have stopped at stations. However, to achieve capacities this high, BRT station footprints need to be significantly larger than a typical LRT station. In terms of cost of operation, each bus vehicle requires a single driver, whereas a light rail train may have three to four cars of much larger capacity in one train under the control of one driver, or no driver at all in fully automated systems, increasing the labor costs of BRT systems compared to LRT systems. BRT systems are also usually less fuel-efficient as they use non-electrified vehicles.

The peak passenger capacity per lane per hour depends on which types of vehicles are allowed on the roads. Typically roadways have 1,900 passenger cars per lane per hour (pcplph). If only cars are allowed, the capacity will be less and will not increase when the traffic volume increases.

When there is a bus driving on this route, the capacity of the lane will be higher and will increase when the traffic level increases. And because the capacity of a light rail system is higher than that of a bus, there will be even more capacity when there is a combination of cars and light rail. Table 3 shows an example of peak passenger capacity.

Safety
An analysis of data from the 505-page National Transportation Statistics report published by the US Department of Transportation shows that light rail fatalities are higher than all other forms of transportation except motorcycle travel (31.5 fatalities per 100 million miles).

However, the National Transportation Statistics report published by the US Department of Transportation states that "Caution must be exercised in comparing fatalities across modes because significantly different definitions are used. In particular, Rail and Transit fatalities include incident-related (as distinct from accident-related) fatalities, such as fatalities from falls in transit stations or railroad employee fatalities from a fire in a workshed. Equivalent fatalities for the Air and Highway modes (fatalities at airports not caused by moving aircraft or fatalities from accidents in automobile repair shops) are not counted toward the totals for these modes. Thus, fatalities not necessarily directly related to in-service transportation are counted for the transit and rail modes, potentially overstating the risk for these modes."

Construction and operation costs

The cost of light rail construction varies widely, largely depending on the amount of tunneling and elevated structures required. A survey of North American light rail projects shows that costs of most LRT systems range from $15 million to over $100 million per mile. This results in costs more typical of subways or rapid transit systems than light rail. At the other end of the scale, four systems (Baltimore, Maryland; Camden, New Jersey; Sacramento, California; and Salt Lake City, Utah) incurred construction costs of less than $20 million per mile. Over the US as a whole, excluding Seattle, new light rail construction costs average about $35 million per mile.

By comparison, a freeway lane expansion typically costs $1.0 million to $8.5 million per lane mile for two directions, with an average of $2.3 million. However, freeways are frequently built in suburbs or rural areas, whereas light rail tends to be concentrated in urban areas, where right of way and property acquisition is expensive. Similarly, the most expensive US highway expansion project was the "Big Dig" in Boston, Massachusetts, which cost $200 million per lane mile for a total cost of $14.6 billion. A light rail track can carry up to 20,000 people per hour as compared with 2,000–2,200 vehicles per hour for one freeway lane. For example, in Boston and San Francisco, light rail lines carry 9,600 and 13,100 passengers per hour, respectively, in the peak direction during rush hour.

Combining highway expansion with LRT construction can save costs by doing both highway improvements and rail construction at the same time. As an example, Denver's Transportation Expansion Project rebuilt interstate highways 25 and 225 and added a light rail expansion for a total cost of $1.67 billion over five years. The project came in under budget and 22 months ahead of schedule.

LRT cost efficiency improves dramatically as ridership increases, as can be seen from the numbers above: the same rail line, with similar capital and operating costs, is far more efficient if it is carrying 20,000 people per hour than if it is carrying 2,400. The Calgary, Alberta, C-Train used many common light rail techniques to keep costs low, including minimizing underground and elevated trackage, sharing transit malls with buses, leasing rights-of-way from freight railroads, and combining LRT construction with freeway expansion. As a result, Calgary ranks toward the less expensive end of the scale with capital costs of around $24 million per mile.

However, Calgary's LRT ridership is much higher than any comparable US light rail system, at 300,000 passengers per weekday, and as a result, its capital efficiency is also much higher. Its capital costs were one-third those of the San Diego Trolley, a comparably sized US system built at the same time, while by 2009 its ridership was approximately three times as high. Thus, Calgary's capital cost per passenger was much lower than that of San Diego. Its operating cost per passenger was also much lower because of its higher ridership.

Compared to buses, costs can be lower due to lower labor costs per passenger mile, higher ridership (observations show that light rail attracts more ridership than a comparable bus service) and faster average speed (reducing the number of vehicles needed for the same service frequency). While light rail vehicles are more expensive to buy, they have a longer useful life than buses, sometimes making for lower life-cycle costs.

Health impact

Integration with bicycles
Light rail lines have various policies on bicycles. Some fleets restrict bicycles on trains during peak hours. Some light rail systems, such as the St. Louis MetroLink, allow bicycles on the trains, but only in the rear sections of cars. Some light rail lines, like San Francisco's, allow only folding bicycles onboard. In some systems dedicated bike parking is available at select stations and others are integrated with local bike share systems.

Variations

Trams operating on mainline railways

Around Karlsruhe, Kassel, and Saarbrücken in Germany, dual-voltage light rail trains partly use mainline railroad tracks, sharing these tracks with heavy rail trains. In the Netherlands, this concept was first applied on the RijnGouweLijn. This allows commuters to ride directly into the city center, rather than taking a mainline train only as far as a central station and then having to change to a tram. In France, similar tram-trains are planned for Paris, Mulhouse, and Strasbourg; further projects exist. In some cases, tram trains use previously abandoned or lightly used heavy rail lines in addition to or instead of still in use mainline tracks.

Some of the issues involved in such schemes are:
 compatibility of the safety systems
 power supply of the track to the power used by the vehicles (frequently different voltages, rarely third rail vs overhead wires)
 width of the vehicles to the position of the platforms
 height of the platforms

There is a history of what would now be considered light rail vehicles operating on heavy rail rapid transit tracks in the US, especially in the case of interurban streetcars. Notable examples are Lehigh Valley Transit trains running on the Philadelphia and Western Railroad high-speed third rail line (now the Norristown High-Speed Line). Such arrangements are almost impossible now, due to the Federal Railroad Administration refusing (for crash safety reasons) to allow non-FRA compliant railcars (i.e., subway and light rail vehicles) to run on the same tracks at the same times as compliant railcars, which includes locomotives and standard railroad passenger and freight equipment. Notable exceptions in the US are the NJ Transit River Line from Camden to Trenton and Austin's Capital MetroRail, which have received exemptions to the provision that light rail operations occur only during daytime hours and Conrail freight service only at night, with several hours separating one operation from the other. The O-Train Trillium Line in Ottawa also has freight service at certain hours.

Ground-level power supply for trams

When electric streetcars were introduced in the late 19th century, conduit current collection was one of the first ways of supplying power, but it proved to be much more expensive, complicated, and trouble-prone than overhead wires. When electric street railways became ubiquitous, conduit power was used in those cities that did not permit overhead wires. In Europe, it was used in London, Paris, Berlin, Marseille, Budapest, and Prague. In the United States, it was used in parts of New York City and Washington, D.C. Third rail technology was investigated for use on the Gold Coast of Australia for the G:link light rail, though power from overhead lines was ultimately utilized for that system.

In the French city of Bordeaux, the tramway network is powered by a third rail in the city center, where the tracks are not always segregated from pedestrians and cars. The third rail (actually two closely spaced rails) is placed in the middle of the track and divided into eight-metre sections, each of which is powered only while it is completely covered by a tram. This minimizes the risk of a person or animal coming into contact with a live rail. In outer areas, the trams switch to conventional overhead wires. The Bordeaux power system costs about three times as much as a conventional overhead wire system and took 24 months to achieve acceptable levels of reliability, requiring the replacement of all the main cables and power supplies. Operating and maintenance costs of the innovative power system still remain high. However, despite numerous service outages, the system was a success with the public, gaining up to 190,000 passengers per day.

Since the late 2010s, ground-level power supply has become more cost-effective than overhead lines.

Comparison to other rail transit modes
With its mix of right-of-way types and train control technologies, LRT offers the widest range of latitude of any rail system in the design, engineering, and operating practices. The challenge in designing light rail systems is to realize the potential of LRT to provide fast, comfortable service while avoiding the tendency to overdesign that results in excessive capital costs beyond what is necessary to meet the public's needs.

Typical rolling stock
The BART railcar in the following chart is not generally considered to be a "light rail" vehicle (it is a heavy rail vehicle), and is only included for comparison purposes.

Train operation

An important factor crucial to LRT is the train operator. Unlike rail rapid transit, which can travel unattended under automatic train operation (ATO), safe, high-quality LRT operation relies on a human operator as a key element. The reason that the operator is so important is that the train tracks often share the streets with automobiles, other vehicles, and pedestrians. If trains were fully automated on roads, nobody would be there to stop the train if a car pulled in front of it. Light rail trains are very sturdily built for passenger safety, and to reduce damage from impacts with cars.

Floor height

This allows them to load passengers, including those in wheelchairs or strollers, directly from low-rise platforms that are little more than raised sidewalks. This satisfies requirements to provide access to disabled passengers without using expensive and delay-inducing wheelchair lifts, while also making boarding faster and easier for other passengers.

Power sources
Overhead lines supply electricity to the vast majority of light rail systems. This avoids the danger of passengers stepping on an electrified third rail. The Docklands Light Railway uses an inverted third rail for its electrical power, which allows the electrified rail to be covered and the power drawn from the underside. Trams in Bordeaux, France, use a special third-rail configuration where the power is only switched on beneath the trams, making it safe on city streets. Several systems in Europe and a few recently opened systems in North America use diesel-powered trains.

Tram and other light rail transit systems worldwide

Around the world, there are many extant tram and streetcar systems. Some date from the beginning of the 20th century or earlier such as Toronto streetcar system, but many of the original tram and streetcar systems were closed down in the mid-20th century, except for many Eastern European countries. Even though many systems closed down over the years, there are still several tram systems that have been operating much as they did when they were first built over a century ago. Some cities (such as Los Angeles and Jersey City) that once closed down their streetcar networks are now restoring, or have already rebuilt, at least some of their former streetcar/tram systems. Most light rail services are currently committed to articulated vehicles like modern LRVs, i.e. trams, except for large underground metro or rapid transit systems.

Several UK cities have substantial light rail networks including the Nottingham Express Transit, Sheffield Supertram, Manchester Metrolink and a small network between Birmingham and The Black Country (West Midlands Metro), with plans to add 6 new lines and extend out to Stourbridge, Birmingham Airport & Walsall.

See also

 Cater MetroTrolley
 Capa vehicle
 General Motors streetcar conspiracy
 H-Bahn
 Light rail in North America
 List of modern tramway and light rail systems in the United Kingdom
 List of rail transit systems in the United States
 List of town tramway systems (all-time lists)
 List of tram and light rail transit systems(operational systems only)
 Medium-capacity rail transport system
 Passenger rail terminology
 Railway electrification system
 Rubber-tyred trams
 Streetcars in North America
 Tram and light rail transit systems

References

External links

 Light Rail Transit Committee of the Transportation Research Board (US)
 Light Rail Transit Association (UK-based, international organization)
 Light Rail Now! (US) A pro-light rail web site, opposing monorails, Bus Rapid Transit (busways), and other less common transportation systems
 Light Rail Netherlands (NL) in English, Nederlands, Русский, Deutsch, Français, Español
 "This Is Light Rail Transit" (PDF) brochure by the American Public Transportation Association (APTA) (2000; updated 2003)
 Photo gallery of the world's light rail 

 
Sustainable urban planning
Tram transport